Francis Longworth Haszard (November 20, 1849 – July 25, 1938) was a Prince Edward Island politician and jurist, the tenth premier of Prince Edward Island. Haszard's family had been United Empire Loyalists moving to PEI from the United States after the American Revolution.

Longworth was born at Bellevue, Lot 49, Prince Edward Island. He studied law, was called to the bar in 1872 and set up practice in Charlottetown. He had been a magistrate in Charlottetown before being elected to the provincial legislature for the first time in 1904 as a Liberal. In 1908, he was asked by the lieutenant governor to become premier after the death of Arthur Peters.

The Liberals had been in power since 1891 and their majority in the legislature had eroded over time. By the time Haszard became premier the Liberals and opposition Conservatives had almost equal strength in the house.

Haszard represented PEI at the Maritime and Inter-Provincial conferences held in 1910 and attempted to obtain a better deal for the province from the federal government.

Haszard left politics in 1911 to accept an appointment to the province's Supreme Court and as Master of the Rolls. He retired from the bench in 1930.

References 
 Francis Longworth Haszard, Premiers Gallery, Government of Prince Edward Island

Premiers of Prince Edward Island
1849 births
1938 deaths
Canadian Anglicans
People from Queens County, Prince Edward Island
Prince Edward Island Liberal Party MLAs
Prince Edward Island Liberal Party leaders